Barossa was an electoral district of the House of Assembly in the colony (Australian state from 1901) of South Australia from 1857 to 1938 and again from 1956 to 1970. Barossa was also the name of an electoral district of the unicameral South Australian Legislative Council from 1851 until its abolition in 1857, George Fife Angas being the member.

Despite Labor not even contesting the seat at the 1962 election, Barossa was one of two 1965 election gains that put Labor in government after decades of the Playmander in opposition. Labor's Molly Byrne retained Barossa at the 1968 election however the seat was abolished prior to the 1970 election. Byrne successfully moved to the new seat of Tea Tree Gully.

The Barossa Valley region is currently a safe Liberal area and is located in the safe Liberal seat of Schubert.

Members

Election results

References

External links
The 13 electorates from 1902 to 1915: The Adelaide Chronicle

Former electoral districts of South Australia
1857 establishments in Australia
1938 disestablishments in Australia
1956 establishments in Australia
1970 disestablishments in Australia
Constituencies established in 1857
Constituencies disestablished in 1938
Constituencies established in 1956
Constituencies disestablished in 1970